"Hair of the dog", short for "hair of the dog that bit you", is a colloquial expression in the English language predominantly used to refer to alcohol that is consumed as a hangover remedy (with the aim of lessening the effects of a hangover). Many other languages have their own phrase to describe the same concept. The idea may have some basis in science in the difference between ethanol and methanol metabolism.

Etymology
The expression originally referred to a method of treatment for a rabid dog bite by placing hair from the dog in the bite wound. Ebenezer Cobham Brewer writes in the Dictionary of Phrase and Fable (1898): "In Scotland it is a popular belief that a few hairs of the dog that bit you applied to the wound will prevent evil consequences. Applied to drinks, it means, if overnight you have indulged too freely, take a glass of the same wine within 24 hours to soothe the nerves. 'If this dog do you bite, soon as out of your bed, take a hair of the tail the next day.'"  He also cites two apocryphal poems containing the phrase, one of which is attributed to Aristophanes. It is possible that the phrase was used to justify an existing practice, as the idea of "like cures like" dates back at least to the time of Hippocrates. It exists today as the basic postulate of classical homeopathy. In the 1930s cocktails known as Corpse Revivers were served in hotels.

An early example of modern usage (poil de ce chien) can be found in Rabelais' 16th century pentalogy Gargantua and Pantagruel, literally translated by Motteux in the late 17th century.

In other languages

Europe 
The phrase also exists in Hungarian, where the literal translation to English is "(You may cure) the dog's bite with its fur", but has evolved into a short phrase ("kutyaharapást szőrével") that is used frequently in other contexts when one is trying to express that the solution to a problem is more of the problem. 

Among the Irish and Mexicans, the phrase 'The Cure' ("curarse la cruda", in Spanish) is often used instead of 'hair of the dog'. It is used, often sarcastically, in the question "Going for a Cure?". In Portuguese, people speak of "a hit" (uma rebatida), meaning to strike away (the hangover with more alcohol). 

In some Slavic languages (Polish, Bosnian, Bulgarian, Croatian, Serbian, Slovenian and Russian), hair of the dog is called "a wedge" (klin), mirroring the concept of dislodging a stuck wedge with another one; hence the popular Polish phrase "[to dislodge] a wedge [with] a wedge"  – [wybijać] klin klinem – which is used figuratively both with regard to alcohol and in other contexts. In Bulgarian, the phrase is "Клин клин избива" (using the "wedge" metaphor common in other Slavic languages). The proper Russian term is опохмелка (opohmelka, "after being drunk"), which indicates a process of drinking to decrease effects of drinking the day before. In Estonia, the phrase used is "peaparandus", which literally translated is "head-repair".

A similar usage is encountered in Romanian, in the phrase "Cui pe cui se scoate" (A nail (fastener) pulls out a nail); in Italian, in the phrase "Chiodo scaccia chiodo"; in Spanish, in the phrase "Un clavo saca otro clavo" (A nail pulls out another nail); and in Turkish, in the phrase "Çivi çiviyi söker". In all four cases, the English translation is "a nail dislodges a nail", though these phrases are not exclusively used to refer to the hangover cure.

In German, drinking alcohol the next morning to relieve the symptoms is sometimes described as "having a counter-beer" (ein Konterbier trinken), and in Japan, drinking alcohol in the morning after drinking too much is called 迎え酒 (mukae-zake), which roughly translates as "counter drinking". In Austria people talk about having a repair-beer (Reparatur-Seidl).

The Dutch have also coined the portmanteaus "reparadler" and "reparipa", referring to Radler and IPA, respectively, being used as repair beverages. Also, the term "Morning-afterpils" is often used. This is a portmanteau of the words "morning-afterpil" which translates to "morning-after pill" , and the word "pils" which is another word for beer, indicating that the beer is used to lessen the effects of the previous day.

In Norwegian, it is usually called "repareringspils", meaning a "beer to repair". In Czech, it is called "vyprošťovák" (extricator). In Swedish, drinking alcohol to relieve a hangover is called having an "återställare", which translates roughly to "restorer". In Danish, a beer the day after drinking, is called a "reparationsbajer", which translates to "repair beer". There is also a saying: "One must rise at the tree where one fell". Similarly, in Dutch, the term "reparatiebier" is frequently used, which also translates to "repair beer".

In Finnish, consuming alcohol the next day is called ”tasoittava” (smoothener, equalizer), ”loiventava” (leveller) or ”korjaussarja” (a repair kit). Also the phrase "Sillä se lähtee millä tulikin" that translates to "What caused it, will also cure it" describes the same concept.

The Americas 
In Costa Rica (Central America), the same expression is used but it refers to a pig, as in: hair of the same pig ("pelos de la misma chancha" in Central America) referring to the same method to cure the hangover. In Puerto Rico, drinking alcohol as a remedy for a hangover is called "matar al ratón", or "to kill the mouse".

Asia 
The earliest known reference to the phrase "hair of the dog" in connection with drunkenness is found in a text from ancient Ugarit dating from the mid to late second millennium BC, in which the god ʾIlu becomes hungover after a drinking binge. The text includes a recipe for a salve to be applied to the forehead, which consists of "hairs of a dog" and parts of an unknown plant mixed with olive oil.

In Korea, alcohol (typically soju) drunk in the morning to relieve hangovers is called "haejangsul" (해장술), which literally translates as "a drink that relieves the bowels." In China, alcohol drunk to relieve hangover is called "huíhúnjiǔ" (回魂酒), which literally translates to "the drink that brings back your soul". In Japan, the equivalent phrase is “mukaezake” (迎え酒), which can be literally translated as “alcohol for facing (greeting) the next day.”

Africa 
In Cape Afrikaans, drinking alcohol to cure a hangover (babbelas) is called "kopskiet", or "shot to the head". In Tanzania, the equivalent Swahili phrase used is "kuzimua" which means "assist to wake up after a coma". The phrase also exists in (Sheng) Swahili Slang: In Kenya taking alcohol to relieve a hangover is called "kutoa lock", translated into "removing the lock".

Scientific background
There are at least two hypotheses as to how "hair of the dog" works. In the first, hangovers are described as the first stage of alcohol withdrawal, which is then alleviated by further alcohol intake. Although  "...Low [ethanol] doses may effectively prevent alcohol withdrawal syndrome in surgical patients", this idea is questionable as the signs and symptoms of hangover and alcohol withdrawal are very different.

In the second, hangovers are partly attributed to methanol metabolism. Levels of methanol, present as a congener in alcohol, have been correlated with severity of hangover and methanol metabolism to the highly toxic formate via formaldehyde coincides with the rate of appearance of hangover symptoms. As both ethanol and methanol are metabolized by alcohol dehydrogenase – and ethanol has a greater binding affinity for this enzyme than methanol – drinking more of the former effectively prevents (or delays) the metabolism of the latter.

In popular culture
In the videogame The Curse of Monkey Island, the main character Guybrush Threepwood needs to make a hangover remedy, which includes "the hair of the dog that bit you" as an ingredient.

In the videogame Kingdom Come: Deliverance, the "Hair o' the dog" potion is a consumable and craftable item used to cure the effects of a hangover on the player character. 

In the videogame “Ponos’s The Battle Cats”, the playable character, Doctor Cat description reads “His medical philosophy is “Hair of the Dog”. If it doesn’t kill ya, it must be working right?!”

In the MMORPGs RuneScape and Old School RuneScape, there is a tavern in the werewolf-populated town of Canifis called Hair of the Dog. 

In the spinoff series Cells at Work! Code Black Chapter 2, the body receives more alcohol when the human takes the hair of the dog during hangover, much to the cells' dismay. This was also portrayed in the anime.

In Stanley Kubricks film The Shining (1980), the character Jack Torrance (played by Jack Nicholson) stands by the hotel bar and is asked by Lloyd the bartender (played by Joe Turkel): 
"What will it be, Sir?", whereby Jack answers "Hair of the dog that bit me". Lloyd follows up by saying "Bourbon on the rocks", and Jack answers "That'll do her!".

See also
 Corpse Reviver
 Hangover food

References

External links

"Early Modern Whale: Langley Marish: Milton, and the hair of the dog" a compilation of early uses of the expression "hair of the dog".

Alcohol and health
Drinking culture
Substance-related disorders